Kevin Davis (born 26 January 1986) is a rugby union footballer who plays as a prop.
Davis was named in the Queensland Reds Extended Playing Squad for the 2012 Super Rugby season, however he did not make any appearances for the first-team. His performances for his local club, University ensured he retained his spot in the Reds EPS for the 2013 season.
In July 2013, it was announced that he joined London Welsh in the RFU Championship. On 21 May 2014, Davis signed for Ealing Trailfinders who compete in National League 1, the third level of domestic rugby in England.
Ealing have announced that Kevin will be moving on and therefore not renewing his contract for season 2015/16.

References

1986 births
Living people
English rugby union players
Queensland Reds players
Rugby union props
Rugby union players from Bristol
English expatriate rugby union players
Expatriate rugby union players in Australia
British expatriates in Australia